"King's Tide" is the 21st episode and the season finale of the second season of the American animated television series The Owl House, and the 40th episode of the series overall. The episode was directed by Bridget Underwood, and the teleplay was written by Zach Marcus & Dana Terrace, from a story by Terrace, Emmy Cicierega, Mikki Crisostomo, Madeleine Hernandez, Marcus & John Bailey Owen.

The episode premiered on May 28, 2022 on Disney Channel and garnered 0.25 million viewers when it premiered. It received near-universal acclaim, with praise for its tone, emotional weight, suspense, animation, and cliffhanger.

Plot 
Continuing from "Clouds on the Horizon", King has a dream where he hears Emperor Belos and the Collector arguing, with the latter being angry that they haven't been freed from the mirror they're trapped in yet. In an airship, Amity, Alador, Hunter, and Gus are frustrated and begin to argue at each other over the fact that Luz Noceda was taken by Belos. Willow, to stop the arguing, orders the palismen on the airship to bring a crate of food to make sure everyone on the airship can eat. King learns a lesson from Willow: "There is always a way to help, and all you have to do is figure out how."

Meanwhile, Belos gives a speech to the general public. The heads of the Coven Against the Throne proceed to chase Belos on the podium, with Eda Clawthorne preparing to disguise herself as Raine Whispers, who is head of the Bard Coven. After an emotional and romantical moment between Eda and Raine, Eda, disguised as Raine, goes to Belos with the rest of the coven heads, gathering around him in a circle. Belos confesses that he had changed the arrangement, having Darius Deamonne switch positions so that Eda would be between Adrian Vernworth and Terra Snapdragon. He then proceeds to draw sigils on the ground, starting a ceremony. Belos says goodbye to the Boiling Isles, and teleports to a place where the Collector resides. Belos reveals to them that he will not free them from their prison due to only having enough Titan's Blood for a one-way trip to the Human Realm. In a child-like state, the Collector throws a tantrum over this fact. Kikimora suddenly enters with who they think is Hunter, but is actually Luz under an illusion spell. Kikimora begs Belos for a right-hand man position under him, but Belos refuses. He then goes to throw the mirror the Collector is trapped in down a pit before going to fight to Luz.

Meanwhile, the airship crashes into the ground after Coven Guards order Abomatons to attack it. At the same time, Eda tries to disrupt the ceremony, but the other coven heads realise "Raine" is a disguised Eda and stop her. As Raine is found, they are forced into the ceremony to continue it.

Belos is attacked by Luz, but is able to avoid the attacks. However, he is impressed by Luz's magic and proposes that she join his side. Luz is disgusted by the deal and refuses. In response, Belos starts turning Luz into stone. Luz proceeds to find a sigil glove, and tells Belos that the era of the witch hunter in the Human Realm is over. At the very last second, she negotiates a deal that she will be Belos' guide in the Human Realm if he spares her friends. Belos accepts the deal and stops the petrification, turning Luz back to normal. As they shake hands, Luz brands Belos with a sigil, and he starts to lose his consciousness.

The ceremony begins, and all the coven heads begin to lose their magic. Meanwhile, King wakes up from being unconscious and finds out the people from the airship are fighting off Abomatons. After fighting for some time, they proceed to run towards the ceremony, where they have managed to find all the coven heads unconscious. Eda is woken up and is taken to where Luz is along with the rest of the airship crew.

Belos turns into an extremely wild and strong form, and starts to attack Luz. As soon as Belos catches Luz, Willow casts some vines to hold him down. King is led towards another room where Kikimora is, who reveals that the only way to stop Belos is to free the Collector. King agrees to try and complete this task. In the meantime, a fight ensues between Belos and the airship crew. Momentarily, Belos turns into a human, triggering a PTSD-like response from Hunter.

Once King and Kikimora see the mirror keeping the Collector. The Collector recognizes King as the child of the Titan and asks him if he wants to play hide-and-seek. However, King tries to ask the Collector if he wants to stop Belos and the draining spell. After refusing, the Collector eventually accepts the offer after King disguises the offer as a game called "Owl House". King finally frees the Collector from the mirror, who attacks Belos and splatters him against the wall, turning him into goo. Luz and her friends also try to convince the Collector to play "Owl House", who accepts by ending the eclipse through moving the moon. They then begin to reshape the world due to claiming that, if they will play "Owl House", they need an Owl House. The portal suddenly opens, and Willow realises that it's their only way to escape the Collector, much to the dismay of Luz, who does not want to leave the Boiling Isles and Eda behind. Luz's friends run to the portal, and a piece of Belos' remains fall on Hunter's shoulder. The portal is found to be collapsing, with the door planning to close at any moment. At the same time, the Collector essentially kidnaps King to play "Owl House" with him, and Luz tries to rescue King. King eventually refuses and sacrifices himself by screaming a sound-wave at Luz, pushing her through the door, the portal closing behind them. Luz and her friends walk to Camila's house, to the shock of Camila. Luz announces that she is back from the Boiling Isles. In a post-credit scene, the remains of Belos that followed Hunter to the Human Realm come to life and close the door to the shack where the portal was kept.

Critical reception 
Lee Arvoy, writer for TV Source Magazine, would write a heavily positive review for the episode, citing that the episode was a great season finale and that it had been an emotional episode. Along with this, Arvoy praised the cliffhanger brought upon the remaining inhabitants of the Boiling Isles, the exploration of Hunter and Luz's trauma sustained from the Day of Unity, and an overall feeling of nervousness and anxiousness about the future of the series' characters.

Jade King, writer for pop culture website TheGamer would also write a heavily positive review on the episode, connecting the series itself to fellow Disney Channel show Amphibia, saying that "King's Tide" was similar to the season two finale of Amphibia, "True Colors". King would write that the episode had pushed the medium for children's television, saying that the episode had "daring story developments, bold character moments, and subject matter that is way heavier than expected for the demographic... [it delivered] a finale that surpassed all expectations." Along with it, King would also praise the cliffhanger brought on to the characters in the series, writing that she had personally wanted Luz and her friends to have fun in the Human Realm after Luz had suffered mental trauma during the events of the Day of Unity.

References 

The Owl House (season 2) episodes
Television episodes about rebellions
Television episodes about mass murder